Al-Shamiya Sport Club is an Iraqi football team based in Al-Shamiya District, Al-Qādisiyyah, that plays in Iraq Division Two.

Managerial history
 Hussein Mahdi
 Hafidh Kadhim
 Samah Hussein
 Rasim Jalil

See also 
 2020–21 Iraq FA Cup
 2021–22 Iraq FA Cup

References

External links
 Al-Shamiya SC on Goalzz.com
 Iraq Clubs- Foundation Dates

1991 establishments in Iraq
Association football clubs established in 1991
Football clubs in Al-Qādisiyyah